Borja Virto Astudillo (born 4 February 1991) is a Spanish professional golfer.

Virto played college golf at Iowa State University for two years.

Virto played on the Alps Tour in 2014, winning twice, and finishing fourth on the Order of Merit. This finish secured him a Challenge Tour card for 2015 but he finished T-18 at the 2014 European Tour Qualifying School (after starting at the second stage) to earn his European Tour card for 2015.

He split time between both tours in 2015 and won on the Challenge Tour at the D+D Real Slovakia Challenge in July and The Foshan Open in October.  He finished 2015 in third place on the Challenge Tour, earning a place on the European Tour for 2016.

Amateur wins
2009 Spanish Under 18 Championship

Professional wins (4)

Challenge Tour wins (2)

Alps Tour wins (2)

Team appearances
Amateur
European Boys' Team Championship (representing Spain): 2008, 2009
European Amateur Team Championship (representing Spain): 2013

See also
2014 European Tour Qualifying School graduates
2015 Challenge Tour graduates

References

External links

Spanish male golfers
European Tour golfers
Iowa State Cyclones men's golfers
Sportspeople from Pamplona
1991 births
Living people
20th-century Spanish people
21st-century Spanish people